is a 2009 tribute album, is kade from , which translates to "Bad friend" and is the origin of Yū Aku's name.

The final track, "Kawahara no Ishikawa Goemon" was originally recorded by Eiichi Ohtaki (under the pseudonym "Niagara Fallin' Stars") on his 1978 album Let's Ondo Again. The song incorporates the melodies of the Pink Lady songs "Nagisa no Sindbad", "S.O.S.", "Wanted", "Carmen '77", "Pepper Keibu", and "UFO".

Track listing 
CD

DVD (Limited Edition)
"Kawahara no Ishikawa Goemon" (Music Video)
 Includes "making of" clips.

References

External links

2009 compilation albums
Tribute albums
Pony Canyon albums